The cardiophrenic angle is the angle between the heart and the diaphragm, as seen on imaging (most commonly X-ray). There are two cardiophrenic angles, however the one on the right is obscured by the cardiohepatic angle (the angle between the heart and liver).

See also 
 Costodiaphragmatic recess (Costophrenic angle)
 Costomediastinal recess

References

Cardiac anatomy